Edson Ricardo Martins (born 4 October 1989 in São Paulo) is a bobsledder from Brazil. He competed for Brazil at the 2014 Winter Olympics in the four-man competition where he placed in 29th position out of 30 teams along with (Edson Bindilatti, Fábio Gonçalves Silva and Odirlei Pessoni).

He qualified to represent Brazil at the 2022 Winter Olympics.

References 

1989 births
Living people
Brazilian male bobsledders
Olympic bobsledders of Brazil
Bobsledders at the 2014 Winter Olympics
Bobsledders at the 2018 Winter Olympics
Bobsledders at the 2022 Winter Olympics
Sportspeople from São Paulo